Oussama M'Hamsi (born 30 November 1998) is a Moroccan footballer who plays as a defender.

Career

Alessandria
Following a two-year loan spell with Casale in Serie D, M'Hamsi signed his first professional contract with Alessandria. He made his league debut for the club on 15 December 2019, coming on as a 71st minute substitute for Francisco Sartore in a 2-1 home victory over Pro Vercelli.

References

External links

1998 births
Living people
Casale F.B.C. players
U.S. Alessandria Calcio 1912 players
Serie D players
Serie C players
Moroccan footballers
Moroccan expatriate footballers
Expatriate footballers in Italy
Moroccan expatriate sportspeople in Italy
Association football defenders